Flash prose, also known as flash literature, is brief creative writing, generally on the order of between 500 and 1500 words. It's also an umbrella term that encompasses various short format works such as prose poetry, short essays and other works of creative fiction and nonfiction. The term flash implies fast, impromptu, and short format. The term flash prose is generally used in the context of writing competitions or other public exhibitions of creativity or skill with language such as weblogs or non-journalistic writing in, for example, a daily, a journal or another type of periodical.

See also
Prose poetry
Flash fiction
Creative nonfiction
Vignette

External links
Ohio State University Department of English Annual Alumni Flash Prose Writing Contest

Narrative forms
Prose
Short story types